Leo Fuchs (May 15, 1911 – December 31, 1994) was a Polish-born American actor. According to YIVO, he was born Avrum Leib Fuchs in Warsaw; according to Joel Schechter, he was born in Lwów, Galicia, then Poland, now called Lviv, Ukraine.

Fuchs performed in many Yiddish and English plays and movies throughout the mid-twentieth century, and was famed as a comic, a dancer, and a coupletist. He wrote much of his own material and toured widely.

Early life
Fuchs was born into a Yiddish theatrical family: his father, Yakov Fuchs, was a character actor; his mother, Róża Fuchs (Ruzha Fuchs), was "a leading lady of the musical theatre who perished in the Holocaust of the 1940s," shot dead by Nazi Germans. He began acting (in Polish) when he was five years old, and was praised when he performed at the Warsaw cabaret Qui Pro Quo when he was 17.

Career
His American debut was at the Second Avenue Theater in the Yiddish Theater District in Lucky Boy with Moishe Oysher in 1929. He moved to New York City in 1935. In his prime, he was known as "The Yiddish Fred Astaire", appearing both on Broadway and in film. In 1936, he married fellow actor Mirele Gruber and toured with her through Poland for a year. In 1937 he made two movies, the short I Want to Be a Boarder (in which he sang his famous song Trouble) and I Want to Be a Mother with Yetta Zwerling. In 1940 he starred in Amerikaner Shadkhen (American Matchmaker). He divorced in 1941 and later married Rebecca Richman.

Starting in the 1960s, Fuchs performed in English-language plays and television, as well as Hollywood films, including The Story of Ruth (1960). Two of his best-known roles were in The Frisco Kid (1979), in which he played with Gene Wilder, and as Hymie Krichinsky in the film Avalon (1990). He died in Los Angeles in 1994.

Filmography

Movies

Television

References

Bibliography
 Friedman, Jonathan C. Rainbow Jews: Jewish and Gay Identity in the Performing Arts. Plymouth, UK: Lexington, 2007.
 Lugowski, David. "'Pintele' Queer: The Performance of Jewish Male Heterosexuality in Yiddish American Cinema of the Great Depression." In Griffin, Sean. Hetero: Queering Representations of Straightness. Albany, NY: SUNY Press, 2009. 53–70.
 Schechter, Joel. Messiahs of 1933: How American Yiddish Theatre Survived Adversity through Satire. Philadelphia, PA: Temple UP, 2008.

External links

 There are several Leo Fuchs songs on NYU's Yiddish Theater archive:
 Hopalong Knish
 You Gotta Cut Off His Head
 The Yiddisher Chinaman

1911 births
1994 deaths
Jewish American male actors
Jewish cabaret performers
Actors from Lviv
People from the Kingdom of Galicia and Lodomeria
Jews from Galicia (Eastern Europe)
Austro-Hungarian Jews
Yiddish theatre
Polish cabaret performers
Jewish Polish male actors
Polish emigrants to the United States
People from Greater Los Angeles
Yiddish theatre performers
Burials at Hollywood Forever Cemetery
20th-century American male actors
Vaudeville performers
20th-century comedians
20th-century American Jews